Acacia chrysella is a shrub belonging to the genus Acacia and the subgenus Phyllodineae and is native to Western Australia.

Description
It has many glabrous branches. The erect phyllodes have a linear to occasionally narrowly oblanceolate shape that can be shallowly incurved. It blooms from November to August and produces yellow flowers. The simple golden inflorescences contain three to ten heads per raceme with globular heads with a diameter of  containing 15 to 25 light golden flowers.

Taxonomy
The species was first formally described by the botanists Joseph Maiden and William Blakely in 1928 as part of the work Descriptions of fifty new species and six varieties of western and northern Australian Acacias, and notes on four other species as published in the Journal of the Royal Society of Western Australia. The species was reclassified by Leslie Pedley in 2003 as Racosperma chrysellum then moved back to genus Acacia in 2006.

The type specimen was collected near Merredin in 1917 by Frederick Stoward.

A chrysella belongs to the Acacia microbotrya group and is most closely related to Acacia aestivalis, Acacia brumalis, Acacia chamaeleon and Acacia harveyi.

Distribution
It is native to an area in the Great Southern, Wheatbelt and the Goldfields-Esperance regions of Western Australia where it grows in sandy, loam or clay soils.

See also
List of Acacia species

References

chrysella
Acacias of Western Australia
Plants described in 1928
Taxa named by Joseph Maiden
Taxa named by William Blakely